Events from the year 2008 in Indonesia

Incumbents

Events
 May 13: Miss Indonesia 2008 
 August 15: Puteri Indonesia 2008 
 October: Indonesian Atheists is formed. 
 November 16: 2008 Sulawesi earthquake
 November 19: National Committee for West Papua is established.

Sport

 2008 Indonesia national football team results 
 2007–08 Liga Indonesia Premier Division
 2008 Indonesian Women's Football Tournament
 2008 Asian Junior Athletics Championships 
 2008 Thomas & Uber Cup
 2008 Indonesia Super Series
 2008 Pekan Olahraga Nasional 
 2008 FIBA Asia Under-18 Championship for Women
 2008 Asian Beach Games
 Indonesia at the 2008 Asian Beach Games
 Indonesia at the 2008 Summer Olympics
 Indonesia at the 2008 Summer Paralympics

 
Indonesia